Aroga kurdistana is a moth of the family Gelechiidae. It is found in Turkey.

References

Moths described in 2011
Aroga
Moths of Asia